The Australia women's cricket team played the West Indies women's cricket team in September 2019. The tour consisted of three Women's One Day Internationals (WODIs), which formed part of the 2017–20 ICC Women's Championship, and three Women's Twenty20 International (WT20I) matches. The first fixture of the tour, at the Coolidge Cricket Ground in Antigua, was the Australia's first ever WODI match in the Caribbean. Australia won the WODI series 3–0, their fifth-consecutive series sweep and their fifteenth win in WODIs in a row. As a result, they became the first team to qualify for the 2021 Women's Cricket World Cup. Australia also won the WT20I series 3–0.

Squads

Ahead of the tour, Hayley Matthews was withdrawn from the West Indies' squad after breaching Cricket West Indies' code of conduct. She was replaced by Sheneta Grimmond. Britney Cooper was added to the West Indies' squad for the third WODI match, replacing Kycia Knight, who was ruled out due to an injury.

WODI series

1st WODI

2nd WODI

3rd WODI

WT20I series

1st WT20I

2nd WT20I

3rd WT20I

Notes

References

External links
 Series home at ESPN Cricinfo

2019 in women's cricket
2017–20 ICC Women's Championship
2019 in Australian cricket
2019 in West Indian cricket
International cricket competitions in 2019–20
West Indies 2019-20
Australia 2019-20